Bristol Academy is an international pre-school, primary school and secondary school in Karu, Abuja, Nigeria established in September 2002.

It has approximately 338 students and 70 staff.

References

External links
 Official website

International schools in Abuja
Educational institutions established in 2002
2002 establishments in Nigeria